Hannah Run is a stream in Adams County, Ohio.

Hannah Run was named for William Hannah, a pioneer settler.

See also
List of rivers of Ohio

References

Rivers of Adams County, Ohio
Rivers of Ohio